Homalium undulatum is a species of plant in the family Salicaceae. It is a tree found in Peninsular Malaysia. It is threatened by habitat loss.

References

undulatum
Trees of Peninsular Malaysia
Vulnerable plants
Taxonomy articles created by Polbot